Cuban American literature overlaps with both Cuban literature and American literature, and is also distinct in itself. Its boundaries can blur on close inspection. Some scholars, such as Rodolfo J. Cortina, regard "Cuban American authors" simply as Cubans "who live and write in the United States." Canonical writers include Reinaldo Arenas, Rafael Campo, Nilo Cruz, Daína Chaviano, Carlos Eire, Roberto G. Fernández, Gustavo Pérez Firmat, Cristina García, Carolina Garcia-Aguilera, Oscar Hijuelos, Melinda Lopez, Eduardo Machado, Orlando Ricardo Menes, José Martí, Achy Obejas, Ricardo Pau-Llosa, and Virgil Suárez.

History

The literature of Cuban Americans may be read in light of Cuban immigration to the United States and/or Cuban exile. Cortina incorporates this history into his grouping of Cuban American literary output into "generations": neoclassical (circa 1800–1825), romantic (1825–1850), realist–naturalist (1850–1880), impressionist (1880–1910), avant-garde (1910–1940), existentialist (1940–1960), revolutionary (1960–1985), and postmodern (1985–).

Cuban-American literature may be found in Spanish-language United States newspapers such as:
 El Eco de Cuba (est. 1855 in New York)
 El Horizonte (est. 1850 in New York by Miguel Teurbe Tolón)
 El Mulato (est. 1854 in New York)
 La Verdad (1848-1860, New York)

See also
 List of Cuban-American writers
 Cuban immigration to the United States

References

Bibliography

in English
 A. R. Hernández and Lourdes Casal. "Cubans in the United States: A Survey of the Literature" Estudios Cubanos Vol. 5 (1975).
  (Anthology)
  
 
  
 Lillian D. Bertot. The Literary Imagination of the Mariel Generation. Miami: Cuban American National Foundation, 1995.
 
  (Anthology; includes writer biographies)
 
 Rodrigo Lazo. "Los Filibusteros: Cuban Writers in the United States and Deterritorialized Print Culture" American Literary History 15 (January 2003): 87-106.
 
 
  
  (Essays by Jorge Febles, Gustavo Pérez Firmat, Iraida H. López, William Luis, Elena Rivero, Adriana Méndez Rodenas)
  
Armando Simon (2014) The Cult of Suicide and Other Scifi Stories. Raleigh: Lulu Press.

in Spanish
  1982- (Founded by Belkis Cuza Malé and Heberto Padilla)
  1986-
 González, Yara, “La poesía cubana en los Estados Unidos” in Culturas hispánicas en los Estados Unidos, eds. María Jesus Buxó Rey; Tomás Calvo Buezas (Cultura Hispánica Madrid, 1990)
 Armando Simon, "Infidel!" Raleigh, Lulu Press, 2008.

External links
 
  (includes information about Cuban-American literature)